The New Zealand Productivity Commission is an independent Crown entity whose purpose is "to provide advice to the Government on improving productivity in a way that is directed to supporting the overall wellbeing of New Zealanders, having regard to a wide range of communities of interest and population groups in New Zealand society.”

History

The New Zealand Productivity Commission Act was passed in December 2010, creating the New Zealand Productivity Commission as an independent Crown entity. The commission was established as a condition of the ACT Party supporting the Government on confidence and supply, with then Finance Minister Bill English describing it as working "closely with and be closely modelled on" the Australian Productivity Commission. The commission began operating on 1 April 2011.

Work programme

The Commission exists to provide recommendations on ways to improve productivity and to increase understanding of the issues affecting productivity. Its work considers whether laws, policies, regulations and institutions that affect New Zealand's productivity can be improved.

The commission has two principal output areas: inquiries and research.

 Inquiries - The Government chooses inquiry topics for the commission. The referring Ministers must consult with the commission on the terms of reference which stipulate the length, scope and terms of the project - the inquiry can cover any sector or issue within the New Zealand economy. Once the terms of reference are set, the commission is required to act independently. Inquiries are big pieces of research, consultation, engagement and analysis, generally taking 12 months (although not linked to the annual financial cycle). The time allowed recognises the importance of engaging extensively with those who have an interest in the topics, to ensure all points of view are considered, to get the best available information, to understand different perspectives and to test ideas. At the start of the inquiry an issues paper is released with questions to assist participation. After research, consultation, engagement and analysis a draft report is produced and consulted on before the findings and recommendations are finalised in a final report to the Government. The responsible Minister must present a copy of the final report to the House of Representatives as soon as practicable after the Minister receives it. It is up to the Government to decide what, if any, action they take.
 Research into and promotion of productivity - The Commission self-initiates research on, and promotes understanding of, productivity-related matters. Promoting understanding of productivity issues can take many forms besides communications activity to support inquiry and research work. The Commission regularly speaks about productivity issues to different sectors and uses multimedia and social media to engage with different audiences.

At a glance
 The commission has a small team of analysts, economists and support staff guided and governed by four part-time Commissioners.
 Analysis, advice and research is focused on improving New Zealand's productivity – at an individual, business and institutional level. The ultimate goal is to contribute to a more prosperous, secure and healthy society.
 The commission's work considers whether current laws, policies, regulations and institutions best support improved productivity and in doing so, are in the best interests of all New Zealanders.
 The commission is independent and neutral in approach. It can work across government agencies and policy portfolios to give advice on difficult and often politically sensitive topics.
 It engages deeply and meaningfully on complex matters where core agencies are often constrained in their ability to engage.
 The work style is collaborative – working with and across agencies and organisations to ensure work is relevant, useful and contributes to an improved understanding of productivity.

References

External links
 

New Zealand independent crown entities
2011 establishments in New Zealand
Productivity organizations